Jeremy Lee or Leigh may refer to:
Jeremy Lee (chef), British celebrity chef
Jeremy Lee (singer), member of Hong Kong boy group Mirror
Jeremy Lee, singer with Ashbury
Jeremy Leigh, character in The Gingerdead Man

See also
Jerry Lee (disambiguation)